Seth Caplan is an American film producer who lives in Los Angeles, CA. His works include, First Girl I Loved, In Search of a Midnight Kiss, Flatland: The Movie, and Teenage Dirtbag. Seth grew up in Chicago, Illinois where he attended the Francis W. Parker School. He is a graduate of the Plan II program at the University of Texas.

Filmography
Mercy Black 2019
Blood Fest 2018
First Girl I Loved (2016)
The Loner (2016)
Villisca (2016)
Follow (2015)
Meet Me in Montenegro (2013)
You, Me & the Circus (2012)
Flatland 2: Sphereland (2012)
Appointment in Vancouver (2010)
The 2 Bobs (2009)
Teenage Dirtbag (2009)
In Search of a Midnight Kiss (2007)
Flatland: The Movie (2007)
The Cassidy Kids (2006)
Duncan Removed (2006)

Awards
In 2016, Seth won the Sundance Film Festival Audience Award: NEXT for First Girl I Loved, for which he was a producer.

In 2009, Seth won the Independent Spirit John Cassavetes Award for In Search of a Midnight Kiss, for which he was a producer.

Additional Work
In 2001, Seth co-founded Enspire Learning  with college friends Ben Glazer and Bjorn Billhardt. Seth remains a major shareholder in the company.

Personal life
Seth is married to Kristen (Kolada) Caplan.

References

External links 
 

Living people
American film producers
Independent Spirit Award winners
1977 births
University of Texas alumni
Francis W. Parker School (Chicago) alumni